The 2020 season was Terengganu's third season in the Malaysia Super League since the rebranding in 2017.

Coaching staff

Squad information

Transfers

In

Out

Retained

Friendlies

Pre-season Friendlies

Tour of Kuala Lumpur

Tour of Bangkok

Mid-season Friendlies

Competitions

Malaysia Super League

League table

Matches

Malaysia FA Cup
cancelled

Malaysia Cup

Statistics

Appearances and goals

Terengganu FC II

Appearances and goals

Players with no appearances not included in the list.

|}

References

Terengganu FC seasons
Terengganu I
Malaysian football club seasons by club